José María Quesada (ca. 1778 – ca. 1858) was Mayor of Ponce, Puerto Rico, from 1 October 1848 to 31 December 1848.

Background
Quesada was a Spaniard who migrated to Puerto Rico from Venezuela in 1819, establishing himself in Ponce. His wife was Maria del Rosario Perez, and they had three children, Jose Maria (Jr.), Eustaquio and Eustaquia.

Merchant business
In 1826, Quesada and his two male children formed a business corporation in Ponce and established it as a financial services company focused on money lending. On 27 February 1820 there was a fire in Ponce that destroyed almost the entire city. Over one hundred of the best residences in the city were destroyed and most of the businesses, and two-thirds of the townspeople were left homeless. Among the business losses were Jose Maria Quesada's.

See also

 List of Puerto Ricans
 List of mayors of Ponce, Puerto Rico

References

Notes

Further reading
 Ramon Marin. Las Fiestas Populares de Ponce. Editorial Universidad de Puerto Rico. 1994.

External links
 Guardia Civil española (c. 1898) (Includes military ranks in 1880s Spanish Empire.)

Mayors of Ponce, Puerto Rico
1770s births
1850s deaths

Year of death uncertain
Year of birth uncertain